Dindicodes harutai is a moth of the family Geometridae first described by Yazaki in 1992.

Subspecies
Dindicodes harutai harutai (Yazaki, 1992)
Dindicodes harutai infuscatus (Yazaki, 1992)

References

Moths described in 1992
Pseudoterpnini